The statue of Jim Thorpe is installed outside the Oklahoma Sports Hall of Fame, next to Oklahoma City's Chickasaw Bricktown Ballpark, in the U.S. state of Oklahoma.

References

External links

 Jim Thorpe - Oklahoma City, OK at Waymarking

Bricktown, Oklahoma City
Monuments and memorials in Oklahoma
Outdoor sculptures in Oklahoma City
Sculptures of men in Oklahoma
Sculptures of Native Americans
Statues in Oklahoma